Verizon Fios is a bundled internet access, telephone, and television service provided by Verizon Communications that operates over a fiber optical network within the United States.

History

Early development (1995–1996) 
The early stages of Fios began when Bell Atlantic (now Verizon Communications) was testing its video service "Stargazer" in 1995. This was the first commercial video on demand (VOD) service, which was tested for 1,000 homes in northern Virginia. During this time there were talks of developing a fiber optic-based service. In 1996, VP of Programming Bob Townsend told the Baltimore Sun that Stargazer would be "folded into [Bell Atlantic's] deployment of fiber to the curb."

Launch and expansion (2005–2010)
In September 2005, Verizon Communications began offering a fiber optic digital television service, which became available for 9,000 customers in Keller, Texas. Called Fios TV, the service aimed to replace copper wires with optical fibers.

By 2006 Fios was offered in areas of seven US states.

Stable footprint (2010–present)
Verizon announced in March 2010 that it was winding down its Fios expansion, concentrating on completing its network in areas that already had Fios franchises but were not deploying to new areas, which included the cities of Baltimore and Boston, which had not yet secured municipal franchise agreements. Some viewed the halt in expansion as a violation of Verizon's agreements with some municipalities and states, since Verizon has collected revenue to deploy infrastructure upgrades that never occurred. In New Jersey, Verizon collected an additional $15 billion in fees from customers and tax subsidies in exchange for promising fiber optic broadband for the whole state. The New Jersey state government altered the deal in 2014 to allow Verizon to substitute wireless internet access to fulfill its promise instead. Critics pointed out that wireless internet was slower and less reliable.

Television
Fios TV is one of three services offered by Verizon Fios. Verizon offers Fios packages with high-definition and standard-definition TV, as well as video on demand.

Fios TV uses QAM technology to deliver signals to a customer's property using its fiber optic cables. At the home, the optical network terminal turns the signal into a radio frequency signal that can be used on a home's existing coaxial cables, feeding the signal to a set-top box (STB).

Internet access
Fios Internet was the first service offered under Verizon's Fios brand, and is one of three of the product line's current offerings. The broadband Internet service initially launched in Keller, Texas, in 2004, a year before Fios TV was available.

Telephone
In addition to its TV and Internet services, the company also has a voice over IP service via its fiber-optic network, Fios Digital Voice. The service initially launched in Virginia and Maryland in September 2008 and eventually fully replaced an earlier service, VoiceWing, which Verizon offered from 2004 to early 2009.
 
While Verizon also offers plain old telephone service (POTS), it has been reported in various markets that Verizon physically disconnected the copper lines for copper-line phone service at the time that Fios was installed.

Being a VoIP service, a FiOS phone connection will not work if the power is out.

Criticism
On March 13, 2017, Verizon was sued by the City of New York for numerous violations of its agreements with the city, which required the provider to pass a fiber-optic network in "underground conduit, along above-ground utility poles, or otherwise—in front of (or behind) each residential building" in the city by June 30, 2014, and to provide access to officials to their deployment database within thirty days. The city identified approximately one million households that were not yet served by the network, including a larger number of outstanding requests than claimed by Verizon, along with allegations that Verizon refused to install Fios in certain areas, that it routinely failed to make service available to customers within the time it had agreed to, that it required multi-family residential units to enter into bulk purchases or exclusivity deals to receive service promptly (or at all), a violation of FCC policy. According to multiple property managers Verizon refused to meet its obligations unless they entered into such deals. One additionally claimed Verizon had doubled their price per apartment unit in the preceding two years.  NYC officials found that in the case of nearly half of the properties examined, Verizon failed to meet its obligations per the agreement.  

In response, Verizon claimed it would reinforce its policies with employees to ensure this would not be an issue moving forward and questioned the investigation's integrity.

In November 2020, Verizon settled the lawsuit with New York City, whereby the company agreed to bring its fiber-to-the-home service to 500,000 households in New York City. Verizon is required to target its fiber upgrades in low-income areas, including parts of the Bronx, Brooklyn, Manhattan, and Queens. The deadline to provide these services is July 2023. In the settlement, Verizon did not admit wrongdoing.

Carriage disputes

The Weather Channel carriage dispute
On March 10, 2015, at midnight EDT, The Weather Channel and its sister network, Weatherscan, were pulled from Verizon Fios after the two parties were unable to come to terms on a new carriage agreement. The services have respectively been replaced by the AccuWeather Network (which launched on March 13) and a widget provided by Fios featuring forecast content provided by WeatherBug. No public announcement was made regarding the removal until over 12 hours after TWC and Weatherscan were pulled. The Weather Channel offered a less expensive deal to Verizon Fios, which rejected the offer. Verizon cited the wide availability of the internet and mobile apps for consumers to access weather content any time of day as the reason for dropping TWC and its services.

The Weather Channel had earlier signed renewal agreements with major providers that are members of the National Cable Television Cooperative (NCTC), including Time Warner Cable and Cox Communications. While Verizon claimed it was a long-term business decision (instead of a carriage dispute), The Weather Channel launched a campaign to urge viewers to contact Fios about restoring the cable channel and its services.

It was announced on June 19, 2019, that The Weather Channel would return to Fios carriage beginning June 24, 2019.

ESPN lawsuit
In April 2015, ESPN Inc. sued Verizon for breaching its carriage contract by offering ESPN and ESPN2 as part of a separate sports package under its new "Custom TV" service. ESPN's contract requires the two networks to be part of the basic service. Verizon and ESPN reached a deal in May 2016. The terms of the deal were not made public.

Cablevision lawsuit
On May 19, 2015, Cablevision sued Verizon in the Southern District of New York to challenge Verizon's claim that it is 100 percent fiber-based. Cablevision started an advertising campaign to take the case mainstream. The two companies agreed to end the dispute in September 2015. The terms of the deal were not disclosed at the time.

See also
Fiber-optic communication
AT&T U-verse
Google Fiber
Prism TV
Bell Fibe TV

Notes

References

Further reading
 Marsan, C. D. (2008). Verizon Fios tech heading to enterprises; Claims new high-speed optical networks slash floor space, electricity needs. Network World, (1). Retrieved March 8, 2009.
 Searcey, D. (2006). Telecommunications; Beyond Cable; Beyond DSL: Fiber-optic lines offer connection speeds up to 50 times faster than traditional services; Here's what early users have to say. The Wall Street Journal, (R9). Retrieved March 7, 2009.

External links

 Official website
 List of Verizon Fios TV Channels
 Verizon Fios for consumers
 Verizon Fios for businesses

Broadband
Cable television companies of the United States
Internet properties established in 2005
Telecommunications companies established in 2005
Fiber to the premises
Internet service providers of the United States
Fios
Frontier Communications
Video on demand